St Hilda's Church is the Church in Wales (Anglican) parish church of Griffithstown in Torfaen in south-east Wales.

The church stands on the corner of Kemys Street and Sunnybank Road (formerly Church Road). It is dedicated to Saint Hilda, Abbess of Whitby and was built in 1888 in Early English style and consists of chancel, nave and southern porch. There is a vicarage, built later than the church itself, adjacent to the church on Sunnybank Road. The first vicar was Rev Mr James Dunn was also chaplain of the Union Workhouse on Coedygric Road (now County Hospital) and an alumnus of University of Wales, Lampeter. The present vicar (in 2011) is The Reverend P A Golledge (D:2000 P:2001)

The church meets the needs of Anglican worship in Griffithstown but also the wider community including Pontypool.

Church in Wales church buildings
Churches in Torfaen
Churches completed in 1888
Pontypool